Asociația Sportivă Fotbal Club Universitatea Cluj, commonly known as Universitatea Cluj or simply as U Cluj, is a Romanian professional football club based in the city of Cluj-Napoca, Cluj County, that competes in the Liga I, the first tier of the Romanian league system.

Founded in 1919 by doctor Iuliu Hațieganu, Universitatea Cluj has spent more than half of its history in the top flight, but never became national champion. It played five Cupa României finals under four names, and won the trophy in the 1964–65 season after a 2–1 defeat of Dinamo Pitești. Once considered the most important side in the region of Transylvania, its status has been threatened in the 21st century by the success of CFR Cluj, with whom it contests the Cluj derby.

Universitatea players and fans are nicknamed Șepcile roșii ("the Red Caps") after the red berets worn by students of the Cluj University of Medicine. The team traditionally plays in white and black kits, although variations of red, maroon and gold have been used in the past. Its home ground is Cluj Arena, which was opened in 2011 and can host around 30,000 spectators.

History
The Universitatea sports club of Cluj was founded on 23 November 1919 by the "Sports Society of University Students" (abbreviated to "U"), the press from Cluj wrote an announcement that day:"With patriotic warmth for every young Romanian university student to hold on to a holy duty to join the sports lists that are at the University's Secretariat". Its first chairman was Professor Iuliu Hațieganu, a physician and politician. In the early years of its existence "U" Cluj played in local competitions; at the time there was no national football championship in Romania. The team played against Chinezul Timișoara in the 1923 final of the Mara Cup, losing 0–2. "U" played in the Romania national football championship Divizia A from 1932. In their first season "U" finished first in its group and played the championship final against Ripensia Timișoara (0–0 and 3–5).

In the first season of the Romanian Cup, in 1933–34, "U" reached the final, losing against Ripensia Timișoara (0–5). In 1940, "U" moved from Cluj to Sibiu as a result of the Second Vienna Award, when the northern part of Transylvania was ceded to Hungary. In 1942, "U" played in the final of the Romanian Cup for a second time and lost against Rapid București (1–7). In 1945, after the end of the Second World War and the return of the northern part of Transylvania to Romania, "U" returned to its home in Cluj.

In 1946, the name of the club was changed to Știința Cluj (Science Cluj). In 1949, the team reached the final of the Romanian Cup for the third time, but it was beaten by CSCA Bucureștinow called Steaua București (1–2).

At the end of the 1950s and the beginning of the 1960s, the manager of Știința Cluj was Ștefan Kovácsa famous Romanian coach who later became the manager of Ajax Amsterdam. In 1964–65, Știința Cluj won the Romanian Cup; this remained the greatest performance of the club for many years.

In 1966, the name of the team was changed back to "Universitatea". At the end of the 1971–1972 season, "U" was in the best position in the Romanian Championship Divizia A after the Second World War; it finished third in the league table, with the same number of points as the second placed team UTA Arad. In 1998, "U" reached the final of Cupa Ligii but lost to FCM Bacău. In 1999, "U" was relegated into the second Romanian division, Divizia B and in 2000 it was relegated for the first time in its history into the third division, Divizia C. It played one season in the third division, and in 2001 it was promoted back to Divizia B. The manager of the team at the time was the ex-Romanian international, Ioan Ovidiu Sabăuwho started playing football in the 1980s at "U" Cluj.In the 2005–06 Divizia B season, the new objective became promotion to the first league. Under coach Leo Grozavu, who often played highly defensive football, the team made many nil draws and the team lost second place (promotion play-off) by a point, though in the last match days they won 4–0 with the first place and the third, and 3–2 (after leading 3–0) with the second place.

In the beginning of the 2006–07 Liga II season (Divizia B was renamed to Liga II in this season), a new manager, Adrian Falubwho had never coached before but had played over 220 matches for "U" Cluj in the first leaguewas hired. Under his lead, the team had a poor early season and only reached eighth position. Yet, the moment passed and the team reached first position, often separated by over 6 points from the next position. On 19 May 2007, virtual promotion was achieved after a 0–0 draw against second place contender Dacia Mioveni. Three weeks before the final match day, "U" ended its 8-year spell in the lower divisions, returning to the first league for the 52nd season in its history.

2007–08 Liga I season, first season of Liga I in last 8 years for "U" Cluj was a tough one, the club didn't manage very well the promotion and at the end of a tumultuous season the club finished on 18th place, the last one, with only 17 points, returning to Liga II.

2008–09 Liga II season was a transition one and "U" saved from relegation to Liga III in the last round, after a 3–0 victory against Arieșul Turda while the main contra-candidate ACU Arad ended only 1–1 at home against Bihor Oradea, a match which was followed by a major scandal. Bihor Oradea accused ACU Arad of trying to fix the match, a victory being enough for the team from Arad to save from relegation.

In the summer of 2009 "U" Cluj was taken over by Florian Walter, owner of Romprest Service which is one of the leaders of the facility management sector in Romania. After only one season under the ownership of Walter, "U" Cluj promoted to Liga I finishing second in the 2009–10 Liga II season.

In the new season, "U" Cluj demonstrated that was much better prepared from an administrative and sports point of view and managed to finish 2010–11 Liga I season on the eighth place, far away from the relegation area.

2011–12 Liga I season brought "U" to another area of its existence, well known and valuable players like Mircea Bornescu, George Galamaz, Gabriel Boștină, Marian Cristescu, Ovidiu Hoban, Gheorghe Grozav, Laurențiu Marinescu or Tony were bought by the club and the objective was qualification in the UEFA Europa League. Șepcile Roșii finished only on seventh place and failed to achieve the objective, but they got the best ranking of the club in the last 26 years.

In the summer of 2012, Florian Walter left "U" Cluj and becoming the owner of Petrolul Ploiești. Together with his departure, most valuable players left also the club and signed with the team from Ploiești. Left without the main financier Alb-Negrii attempted to form a squad of competitive players with little money. In February 2013 club debts grew worrying and "U" went into insolvency.
Despite all the financial problems the team saved from relegation, finishing 12th at the end of 2012–13 season.

In the spring of 2013 Florian Walter announced that he will return at "U" Cluj. At the end of the 2012–13 season a new problem shaken the already disturbed environment of "U" Cluj. License committee refused to license the club for the 2013–14 Liga I season and decided to relegate it to Liga II. Șepcile Roșii contest the decision at CAS and won, assuring his presence in the next season of Liga I. 2013–14 season it would once again be one without claims for "U" due to financial problems that the club had, also Florian Walter no longer seemed interested in investing too much in the team. With all the problems Studenții managed again to save from relegation, finishing 11th.2014–15 Liga I season was a reorganization one, 6 teams relegated instead of 4, in attempt to reduce Liga I teams from 18 to 14. "U" Cluj struggled with its few resources until the very end, but at the end of the season the club was placed on 15th position and relegated to Liga II after its 5-year spell in Liga I.

The relegation in the Liga II was a real disaster for "U"'s already shaky financial situation. The club made a squad full of young players from the academy hoping that through the ambition of the young players and a miracle the team will promote back in Liga I after only one season of Liga II. That was the only solution for saving the club, which was at that moment in insolvency for 2 years and a half and with an owner, Florian Walter, present only as a name in the papers, without investing in the club anyway and also being in international tracking for tax evasion and money laundering.
2015–16 Liga II season was a season of extremes for "U" Cluj. In the first part of the championship the team had run over expectations and had great chances of promotion. But after the winter break the financial situation become worse and the team started to have bad results which ended with a qualification in the play-out tournament, without any chances of promotion. This moment was a crucial one, without any motivation the team ended the championship on tenth place and relegated to Liga III.

Summer of 2016 it meant a new beginning for "U". With a sporting society in insolvency, with big chances of bankruptcy and an owner arrested for tax evasion and money laundering, there was no other solution than the formation of a new club. Cluj-Napoca Municipality which is the owner of "U" Cluj logo and record terminated the lease agreement with the company of Florian Walter. Than Cluj-Napoca Municipality together with Babeș-Bolyai University and "U" Cluj Supporters Association started a new project entitled ACSF Alb-Negru al Studenților Clujeni (ACSF White-Black of the Students from Cluj) a name that was given to the new team, because the society administered by Florian Walter was not yet bankrupt and the name of FC Universitatea Cluj could not belong to two companies. After the foundation of the new team Cluj-Napoca Municipality rented "U" logo and record to the new society. The team was enrolled in Liga IV-Cluj County, Ioan Ovidiu Sabău has been named team manager and Marius Popescu the new coach. Șepcile Roșii also signed with a lot of valuable players like Octavian Abrudan, Alexandru Păcurar, Dorin Goga or Gabriel Giurgiu. Together with them in the team have been added the most talented players of "U" Cluj Football Academy and the objective was the promotion. The project was a real success and Studenții won Liga IV without any problems, winning 26 matches and making only a draw in a match against Sticla Arieșul Turda. Also the team achieved the number of 1,000 contributing members and a lot of development projects are planned.

On 29 September 2016 Walter's society, FC Universitatea Cluj, has gone bankrupt leaving the name free. But the bankruptcy occurred after the starting of the 2016–17 Liga IV season, so the name remained ACSF Alb-Negru al Studenților Clujeni for that season.
On 11 May 2017 was announced officially that from the 2017–18 season the team will return to the old name, FC Universitatea Cluj and also the basketball team will evolve under the same brand.

Stadium

Ion Moina Stadium, the first football and athletics stadium in Cluj-Napoca, was built between 1908 and 1911 and had a capacity of 1,500. The official inauguration in 1911 was a game between a Cluj team and Galatasaray Istanbul. It was the first game in Europe for Galatasaray; the Cluj team won 8–1. In 1961, new U-shaped stands were built and the capacity of the stadium became 28,000. In 2000, most of the stands were declared structurally unsafe for hosting supporters and were closed, leaving the stadium with a capacity of 12–13,000. In late 2008, the old "Ion Moina" Stadium was demolished, and building works begun for the Cluj Arena. The last official game at the old stadium was played on 22 November 2008; Universitatea drew 0–0 in their Liga II game with Mureșul Deva.

During the construction works for the new stadium, Universitatea played its home games in the 2008–09 and 2009–10 Liga II seasons at the Clujana Stadium and its home games in the 2010–11 Liga I season at the Cetate Stadium in Alba Iulia, Gloria Stadium in Bistrița and Gaz Metan Stadium in Mediaș.

On 11 October 2011, the first match at the new Cluj Arena stadiuma friendly between Universitatea and the Russian team Kuban Krasnodarwas played; Kuban won 4–0. On 16 October 2011, the first official match at the new stadium was played; Universitatea won the Liga I game against FC Brașov 1–0.

Support

"U" has many supporters in Cluj-Napoca, but also in some other parts of Romaniaespecially in Transylvania. One of the reasons for the team's popularity is that Cluj-Napoca has some of Romania's most important universitiesincluding the Babeș-Bolyai University, the largest in the country with more than 45,000 students.

The history of U's fanatic supporters began in the 1970s, when fan-groups started to appear on the stadium. First, in 1972 appeared Amicii U, one of the first supporters groups in Romania. The group started to compose songs along with Music Academy's students and wear accessories like the well-known red hats or pins with the club's crest. Those years, Slavă ție studenție was composed, being nowadays club's anthem. 
After the fall of communist regime, the Ultras idea arrived in Romania. First ultras group founded was Vecchia Guardia in 1996, followed by Ultra Curva Groapa in 1997 and Ultras 19 in 2004.

Some of the present-day ultras groups of "U" Cluj are: Groparii, VG (Vecchia Guardia), BOYS, MADS, FPU (The Few The Proud The Ultras), Potaissa, PPS (Prezenti pentru simbol), MNST (Mănăștur). .

The fanaticism sometimes led to violence, some violent episode being in 1979 when Sportul Studențesc won the match with "U" due to poor referee decisions. After the match, supporters began to shout thieves
in front of the stadium and the police started to fight the angry fans. Other episode happened in 2008, when CFR fans went to one of the main squares of the city to celebrate a Dinamo victory over Steaua, that advantage their team to win the league that year. Some Universitatea fans went to the square and had a fight with the rivals before police intervention.

Rivalries and Friendships

Universitatea have a rivalry with local city team CFR Cluj. The animosity between the teams is one of the oldest in Romanian football. The first incidents between fans of the two sides occurred in the 1920s. A particularly violent episode took place during a derby played in 1924, when the stadium had to be evacuated because of a large-scale fight between supporters. Universitatea won the match 2–1. Other episodes of this rivalry are: in 2005, upset by the fact that Universitatea lost a match against UTA Arad, "U" fans injured CFR players at the Sport Hotel in Cluj-Napoca; in 2008, following a derby, CFR won and obtained its first league title and Universitatea relegated in Liga II, but this match was preceded by a corruption scandal, because Steaua București's owner, Gigi Becali, offered "U" staff one million euros for defeating CFR.

The second-most important rivalry is against FC Rapid Bucuresti due serious clashes between fans in 2006, 2011, 2019.
Another rivalries are Steaua București, Farul Constanta and UTA Arad.

Universitatea's fans have a good friendship with Dinamo's fans, the main rivals of FCSB and Rapid. Dinamo friendship started in the mid-1990s, both ultras groups being linked with "the mentality, fanaticism and nationalist side", although in the 1970s and 1980s, "U" supporters had friendships with other important clubs fans, like Poli Timișoara or Rapid București, these teams being the few that already had fan-groups.

Honours

Domestic

Leagues
Liga I
Runners-up (1): 1932–33
Liga II
Winners (6): 1950, 1957–58, 1978–79, 1984–85, 1991–92, 2006–07
Runners-up (3): 1939–40, 1983–84, 2009–10
Liga III
Winners (2): 2000–01, 2017–18
Liga IV – Cluj County
Winners (1): 2016–17

Cups
Cupa României
Winners (1): 1964–65
Runners-up (4): 1933–34, 1941–42, 1948–49, 2014–15
Cupa Ligii
Runners-up (1): 1998

Junior Teams
The "U" Cluj Under 21 and Junior teams have always ranked among the best in the country and have won several National Championship titles:
 The Under-21s were Romanian champions 3 times in: 1962–63, 1970–71, 1971–72
 The Under-21s were Romanian champions 8 times in: 1955, 1956, 1964–65, 1966–67, 1968–69, 1971–72, 1973–74, 2000–01

Players

First-team squad

Out on loan

Club officials

Board of directors

 Last updated: 6 September 2022
 Source:

Current technical staff

 Last updated: 23 February 2023
 Source:

Shirt sponsors and manufacturers

Records and statistics

European cups all-time statistics

History by season

Key

 Pos = Final position
 P = Played
 W = Games won
 D = Games drawn
 L = Games lost
 GF = Goals For
 GA = Goals Against
 Pts = Points

 Div A / L1 = Liga I
 Div B / L2 = Liga II
 Div C / L3 = Liga III
 L4 = Liga IV
 p = Preliminary Round
 1R = Round 1
 2R = Round 2
 3R = Round 3

 4R = Round 4
 5R = Round 5
 GS = Group stage
 R32 = Round of 32
 QF = Quarter-finals
 R16 = Round of 16
 SF = Semi-finals
 F = Final

The players in bold were the top goalscorers in the division.

Notable former players
The footballers enlisted below have had international cap(s) for their respective countries at junior and/or senior level. Players whose name is listed in bold represented their countries at junior and/or senior level on through the time's passing. Additionally, these players have also had a significant number of caps and goals accumulated throughout a certain number of seasons for the club itself as well.

One-club men
  Dan Anca
  Remus Câmpeanu
  Traian Georgescu
  Mircea Luca
  Cristinel Pojar
  Zsolt Szilágyi
Romania
  Octavian Abrudan
  Mihai Adam
  Laur Aștilean
  Imre Bíró
  Mircea Bornescu
  Aurel Boroș
  Gabriel Boştină
  Dan Bucşa
  Septimiu Câmpeanu
  Horațiu Cioloboc
  Raul Ciupe
  Sever Coracu
  Marcel Coraş
  Nicolae David
  Anton Doboş
  Bogdan Dolha
  Vasile Dobrău
  Francisc Dican
  Adrian Falub
  George Florescu
  Romulus Gabor
  Vasile Gain
  Dorin Goga
  Aurel Guga
  Elemer Hirsch
  Ovidiu Hoban
  Octavian Ionescu
  Zoltán Ivansuc
  Emil Jula
  Vasile Jula

Romania
  Marcel Lăzăreanu
  Valentin Lemnaru
  Paul Marcu
  Viorel Mateianu
  Alpar Meszaros
  Sebastian Moga
  Laurențiu Moldovan
  Lică Movilă
  Andrei Mureşan
  Alexandru Mustățea
  Zsolt Muzsnay
  Cătălin Necula
  Mircea Neşu
  Claudiu Niculescu
  Cornel Orza
  Emil Petru
  Silviu Ploeșteanu
  Adrian Popa
  Octavian Popescu
  Marius Predatu
  Florin Prunea
  Ioan Sabău
  Radu Sabo
  Graţian Sepi
  Andrei Sepci
  Lazăr Sfera
  Rareş Soporan
  Constantin Ștefan
  Ioan Suciu
  Alexandru Suciu
  Marius Suller
  János Székely
  Emil Szolomajer
  Alexa Uifăleanu
  Bogdan Unguruşan
  Călin Zanc
  Dorin Zotincă

Brazil
  Fábio Bilica
  Gabriel Machado
Montenegro
  Milan Jovanović
Poland
  Łukasz Szukała
Portugal
  Sérgio Ribeiro
  Nuno Viveiros
Senegal
  Gaston Mendy
Slovakia
  Robert Veselovsky
South Korea
  Park Jae-hong

Former managers
Source:

 Adalbert Kovács (1932)
 Otto Eckhardt (1933)
 Adalbert Molnár (1933–34)
 Fritsch (1934–35)
 Iosif Kovács (1935–36)
 Otto Eckhardt (1936)
 Janos Szaniszló (1937)
 Adalbert Kovács (1937–38)
 Janos Szaniszló (1938)
 Onoriu Chețanu (1938)
 Ferenc Nyúl (1938–39)
 Janos Szaniszló (1939–40)
 Iosif Kovács (1940–41)
 Onoriu Chețanu (1941–42)
 Maertens (1942–1944)
 Markos Imre (1946)
 Nicolae Kovács (1946–47)
 Nicolae Munteanu (1947–48)
 Ștefan Cârjan (1948)
 Andrei Sepci (1949)
 Iuliu Baratky (1949–51)
 Gheorghe Bărbulescu (1951)
 Ștefan Kovács (1952)
 Vasile Gain (1953)
 Ștefan Kovács (1954–55)
 Petre Rădulescu (1955)
 Ștefan Kovács (1956)
 Nicolae Munteanu (1956)
 Nicolae Szoboszlay (1957)
 Ștefan Kovács (1957–58)
 Virgil Mărdărescu (1958–59)
 Andrei Sepci (1959–61)
 Neța Gheorghe (1961–62)
 Constantin Rădulescu (1962–63)
 Andrei Sepci (1963)
 Mircea Luca (1964)
 Andrei Sepci (1964–66)
 Eugen Mladin (1966–67)
 Nicolae Szoboszlay (1967)
 Constantin Teașcă (1968)
 Ștefan Cârjan (1969–70)
 Silviu Avram (1970)
 Andrei Sepci (1970–71)
 Vasile Băluțiu (1971)
 Ștefan Onisie (1971–73)
 Mircea Luca (1973)
 Silviu Avram (1973–74)
 Vasile Băluțiu (1974–75)
 Paul Popescu (1975–76)
 Constantin Rădulescu (1976–77)
 Petre Moldoveanu (1977–78)
 Toader Pop (1979)
 Gheorghe Staicu (1980–81)
 Angelo Niculescu (1981–83)
 Constantin Ardeleanu (1983)
 Remus Vlad (1983–85)
 Alexa Uifăleanu (1985)
 Remus Vlad (1985–88)
 Cornel Dinu (1989)
 Dan Anca (October 1989 – March 1990)
 Ștefan Sameș (1990)
 Ion Ciocan (1990)
 Vasile Iordache (1990)
 Ioan Sdrobiș (1991–92)
 Remus Vlad (1992–93)
 Dan Anca (1993–94)
 Ioan Andone (1994–95)
 Dan Anca (1995–97)
 Adrian Coca (1997)
 Cornel Țălnar (1997–98)
 Tiberiu Poraczky (1998)
 Dan Anca (Dec 1998–99)
 Marcel Lăzăreanu (1999)
 Grigore Boca (1999)
 Alexa Uifăleanu (1999)
 Zoltan Iașko (1999)
 Petre Gigiu (2000)
 Mircea Cojocaru (2000)
 Ioan Ovidiu Sabău (2000–01)
 Mihai Marian (2001)
 Cristian Mustacă (2001)
 Vasile Gheorghe (2002)
 Dan Anca (2002)
 Vasile Gheorghe (2002)
 Dan Anca (2002–03)
 Ioan Ovidiu Sabău (2003)
 Mircea Cojocaru (2003 – 4 July 2004)
 Marin Ion (July 2004 – 5 July 2005)
 Leontin Grozavu (July 2005–06)
 Francisc Dican (2006)
 Adrian Falub (1 July 2006 – 7 October 2007)
 Gheorghe Mulțescu (19 October 2007 – 16 December 2007)
 Alpar Meszaros (8 January 2008 – 20 August 2008)
 Marius Popescu (August 2008)
 Dorinel Munteanu (26 August 2008 – 26 October 2008)
 Gheorghe Mihali (October 2008 – 9 April 2009)
 Marius Popescu (2009)
 Dorinel Munteanu (2009 – 30 June 2009)
   Carmelo Palilla (July 2009 – 9 August)
 Marius Popescu (August 2009)
 Cornel Țălnar (29 August 2009 – 4 October 2009)
 Cristian Dulca (5 October 2009 – 2010)
 Viorel Hizo (2010)
 Cristian Dulca (2010)
 Marian Pană (16 June 2010 – 8 November 2010)
 Claudiu Niculescu (November 2010)
 Ionuț Badea (19 November 2010 – 14 March 2012)
 Claudiu Niculescu (14 March 2012 – 23 July 2012)
 Cristian Dulca (26 July 2012 – 1 October 2012)
 Marius Popescu (interim) (1 October 2012 – 8 November 2012)
 Marius Șumudică (9 November 2012 – 15 November 2012)
 Marius Popescu (15 November 2012 – 1 February 2013)
 Ionel Ganea (1 February 2013 – 30 September 2013)
 Gheorghe Barbu (interim) (2 October 2013 – 23 October 2013)
 Mihai Teja (23 October 2013 – 4 September 2014)
 George Ogăraru (4 September 2014 – 2 March 2015)
 Adrian Falub (2 March 2015 – 30 June 2015)
 Marius Popescu (27 July 2015 – 27 October 2015)
 Mihai Teja (29 October 2015 – 9 April 2016)
 Zsolt Szilágyi (2016)
 Ovidiu Sărmăşanc (2016)
 Marius Popescu (1 July 2016 – 16 September 2017)
 Adrian Falub (20 September 2017 – 18 October 2018)
 Mircea Cojocaruc (19 October 2018 – 8 December 2018)
 Bogdan Lobonț (8 December 2018 – 14 June 2019)
 Cristian Dulca (20 June 2019 – 2 September 2019)
 Adrian Falub (4 September 2019 – 14 September 2020)
 Costel Enache (17 September 2020 – 10 May 2021)
 Erik Lincar (11 May 2021 – 24 August 2022)
 Eugen Neagoe (25 August 2022 – 31 December 2022)

References

External links

 Official website
 Club profile on UEFA's official website

 
Sport in Cluj-Napoca
Association football clubs established in 1919
Football clubs in Cluj County
Liga I clubs
Liga II clubs
Liga III clubs
Liga IV clubs
University and college association football clubs in Romania
1919 establishments in Romania